Stefania breweri, also known as Brewer's carrying frog (in Spanish rana stefania de Brewer), is a species of frog in the family Hemiphractidae. It is endemic to Cerro Autana, Venezuela, and only known from a single specimen (holotype). It was named for Venezuelan explorer Charles Brewer-Carías.

Description
The holotype, of unknown sex, measures  in snout–vent length (the specimen is somewhat dehydrated was not dissected to avoid damage). The snout is subacuminate in dorsal view and truncate in profile. The canthus rostralis is distinct and straight. The tympanum is distinct with an ossified annulus. The supra-tympanic fold is narrow but distinct. Skin is smooth. The fingers have small discs and no webbing. The toes have small discs and basal webbing. The preserved specimen is dorsally pale orange. A pale white inter-orbital bar is present. The flanks are whitish with a few dark brown bars. The throat, chest, and belly are uniformly pinkish.

Habitat and conservation
The summit is dominated by an open swampy landscape with submesothermic herbaceous vegetation. The dominant plants are Brocchinia hechtioides and Kunhardtia rhodantha. The specimen was found within the tubular rolled leaves of a Brocchinia bromeliad. The only other amphibian known from the summit is Leptodactylus lithonaetes.
 
Stefania breweri has not been observed by two later expeditions to Cerro Autana, in 1972 and in 2001. Although the International Union for Conservation of Nature (IUCN) has assessed S. breweri as vulnerable, Barrio-Amorós and colleagues (2019) suggest that it should rather be classified as "critically endangered" because only single specimen is known (despite later expeditions involving herpetologists) and because the available habitat is very restricted (the summit is 1.9 km²).

References

breweri
Frogs of South America
Amphibians of Venezuela
Endemic fauna of Venezuela
Amphibians described in 2003
Taxa named by Cesar L. Barrio-Amoros
Taxonomy articles created by Polbot
Amphibians of the Tepuis